Microstegium vimineum, commonly known as Japanese stiltgrass, packing grass, or Nepalese browntop, is an annual grass that is common in a wide variety of habitats and is well adapted to low light levels.

Despite being non-native in the United States, it serves as a host plant for some native satyr butterflies, such as the Carolina satyr Hermeuptychia sosybius and the endangered Mitchell's satyr Neonympha mitchellii. Owing to its invasive potential, the plant has been put on the European list of invasive alien species. This means the plant can no longer be imported into or traded in the European Union.

Distribution
It is native in much of South Asia, East Asia, and parts of Southeast Asia, and has since moved to the United States.

Description
The plant flowers in late summer and produces its seeds in the form of a caryopsis shortly thereafter.  
It is quite similar to and often grows along with the North American grass Leersia virginica, but L. virginica lacks the distinctive silver stripe on the center of the leaf that is present on Japanese stiltgrass and also flowers one to two months earlier.

The plant is known to be a common habitat for ticks such as the lone star tick. Browsing deer often transport these ticks into other areas where they can expand.

Invasive species ecology

The plant was accidentally introduced into the U.S. state of Tennessee around 1919 as a result of being used as a packing material in shipments of porcelain from China.  It has spread throughout the Southeastern U.S. and is now found in 26 states.   Microstegium vimineum most commonly invades along roads, floodplain and other disturbed areas, but will also invade undisturbed habitats. Whitetail deer, which do not browse the grass, may facilitate spread by browsing on native species and thereby reducing competition for the exotic plant. Invasion of Microstegium can reduce growth and flowering of native species, suppress native plant communities, alter and suppress insect communities, slow plant succession and alter nutrient cycling.  However, removal of Microstegium can lead to recovery of native plant communities.

Control
As this plant serves as a host for satyr butterflies, including at least one that is ranked imperiled or endangered, its removal, unless accomplished via biological control, should be accompanied by a careful survey to avoid destroying existing butterflies in their various stages of growth as well as to ensure adequate alternative food plant availability.

Biological control is the method of control that is the least-damaging to ecosystems not typified by monoculture, like forested areas, while also being the most efficient in terms of costs.
Biological control is the foundation of the differentiation between native species living in complex ecological balance and non-native invasive species. It is nature's method of maintaining ecological balance.  Herbicide application and human-managed labor such as mowing, tilling, and pulling may be preferred for managing unwanted vegetation on land that is highly disturbed by human activity, such as agricultural land. For more complex ecosystems such as forests, effective biological control can eliminate or greatly reduce adverse impacts such as trampling and other physical disturbance such as soil compaction, the spreading of seeds from clothing, chemical toxicity, unwanted damage to non-targeted species, demanding human labor, petrochemical consumption, and other factors. Biological control agents are being evaluated for their effectiveness in controlling Microstegium vimineum as well as their chance to become pests themselves.

Microstegium vimineum can be controlled with pre-emergent herbicides targeted for crabgrass, in areas where native grasses subject to damage are not present in quantities sufficient to make herbicide application too undesirable. Post-emergent controls can also be considered. Some herbicides that target crab grass contain calcium acid methanearsonate, a chemical that contains the element arsenic. In the U.S., the Agency for Toxic Substances and Disease Registry ranked arsenic as number 1 in its 2001 Priority List of Hazardous substances at Superfund sites. Surfactants should be added to herbicides for better control, unless noted. Non-ionic surfactants are considered less damaging for other plant life, while crop oil containing surfactant is often considered somewhat more effective in killing grasses. Glyphosate has been found to be effective in controlling Microstegium vimineum by using as little as a half-percent of the concentrate in water. Being a non-specific herbicide, however, its effectiveness can come with damage to desirable plant life. Glyphosate also binds to soil phosphate, potentially causing a reduction in phosphate available for the remaining plant life. In addition to herbicides, hand weeding and mowing can be used for removal, in circumstances where such methods are appropriate. As this grass is an annual, in order to be effective, mowing must be performed before the plants go to seed.

References

External links
NPS Plant Invaders of Mid-Atlantic Natural Areas: Japanese Stilt Grass
Maine Invasive Plants: Japanese Stilt Grass, University of Maine
Species Profile of Microstegium vimineum (Japanese Stilt Grass)—United States National Agricultural Library, National Invasive Species Information Center. Lists general information and resources for Japanese stilt grass
Microstegium vimineum in Guide to Invasive and Hegemonic Grasses
Japanese stilt grass  Wisconsin DNR
Japanese stiltgrass - Invasive Plants Association of Wisconsin

Andropogoneae
Flora of Asia